John Anderson (born 1775) was a Scottish wood-engraver and illustrator, a pupil of the British wood-engraver Thomas Bewick.

Life
Anderson was born at Foveran in Scotland in 1775, the son of James Anderson of Hermiston. He was a pupil of Thomas Bewick, taken on at his father's wish to help with illustration of a periodical, The Bee. The relationship with Bewick ended acrimoniously, however, and by the later 1790s he was working for London printers. He went abroad by 1805, and died by 1808.

Works
Anderson cut (after drawings by George Samuel) the blocks which illustrate Grove Hill, a 1799 poem by Thomas Maurice. It was sumptuously issued by Thomas Bensley in 1799, in a book that has been compared with William Somervile's The Chace. Anderson, with Shakespeare's Walk in the book, almost equals Bewick, according to Ernest Radford writing in the Dictionary of National Biography, and his treatment of foliage is reminiscent of the prints in Robert Bloomfield's Farmer's Boy, where the first edition of 1800 notes "with ornaments engraved by Anderson." These wood-engravings have been erroneously ascribed to Bewick.

Anderson also engraved illustrations to an edition of Junius. Redgrave says he formed "a style of his own and showed much ability".

Anderson engraved an 1841 edition of Gilbert White's Natural History of Selborne.

References

Sources

1775 births
Year of death unknown
18th-century Scottish people
18th-century engravers
Scottish engravers
Natural history illustrators